Emily Pfalzer Matheson (born June 14, 1993) is an American women's ice hockey player who was the first captain the Buffalo Beauts of the Premier Hockey Federation (PHF) from 2015-2017.

Internationally, Pfalzer plays for United States women's national ice hockey team and has won a gold medal at the 2015 IIHF Women's World Championship, 2016 IIHF Women's World Championship, 2017 IIHF Women's World Championship and the 2018 Winter Olympics.

Playing career

NCAA 
Pfalzer played for Boston College for her entire NCAA career, 2011–2015, and was the first defender in the program to reach 100 career points.

PHF
Pfalzer made her professional debut in the PHF on October 11, 2015, with the Buffalo Beauts playing against the Boston Pride.

During the 2015–16 season, Pfalzer was named the captain of the Buffalo Beauts on November 11, 2015. On November 22, in a match against the Connecticut Whale, Pfalzer would record five assists, setting a Beauts franchise record for most points in one game.. In January 2016, Pfalzer captained the 1st NWHL All-Star Game, opposing Team Knight captained by Hilary Knight.

International play

USA Hockey 
Having been part of the United States Hockey National Camp since the age of 14, she served as an assistant captain on the US team that captured the gold medal at the 2011 IIHF Under-18 Women's World Championships.

Following the conclusion of her collegiate career, Pfalzer was named to the United States women's national ice hockey team to compete at the 2015 IIHF Women's World Championship. The following year she was named to the 2016 IIHF Women's World Championship.

Pfalzer was selected to participate at the 2018 Winter Olympics, where she helped Team USA beat Canada for a gold medal.

Career stats

NCAA

USA Hockey

Awards and honors
Hockey East All-Rookie Team, Unanimous Selection (2011–12)
2011–12 Boston College Freshman Scholar-Athlete of the Year
2012–13 Second Team Hockey East All-Star 
2013–14 Hockey East Defenseman of the Year 
2012–13 All New England Division 1 Women's All-Star Team
2013–14 First Team Hockey East All-Star  
Top 10 Finalist, 2015 Patty Kazmaier Memorial Award
2014–15 Hockey East First Team All-Star
2015 CCM Hockey Women's Division I All-Americans, First Team

Personal life
During the summer of 2018, Pfalzer became engaged to Pittsburgh Penguins defenceman Mike Matheson and married on July 20, 2019. The two met each other while attending Boston College, where Pfalzer played for the women's and Matheson played for the men's team.

References

External links

1993 births
Living people
American expatriate ice hockey players in Canada
American women's ice hockey defensemen
Boston College Eagles women's ice hockey players
Buffalo Beauts players
Ice hockey players from New York (state)
Ice hockey players at the 2018 Winter Olympics
Medalists at the 2018 Winter Olympics
Mississauga Chiefs players
Olympic gold medalists for the United States in ice hockey
Professional Women's Hockey Players Association players